Rat-baiting is a blood sport that involves releasing captured rats in an enclosed space with spectators betting on how long a dog, usually a terrier, takes to kill the rats. Often, two dogs competed, with the winner receiving a cash prize. It is now illegal in most countries.

History 
In 1835, the Parliament of the United Kingdom implemented an act called the Cruelty to Animals Act 1835, which prohibited the baiting of some animals, such as the bull, bear, and other large mammals. However, the law was not enforced for rat baiting and competitions came to the forefront as a gambling sport. It was very popular in Ireland even before 1835, because of the limited space in larger cities, Dublin and Belfast especially. Some families sought to profit from the large numbers of vermin plaguing the cities and country sides. Many countries adopted this sport after 1835, England having one of the largest participation rates. At one time, London even had at least 70 rat pits.

Atmosphere 
James Wentworth Day, a follower of the sport of rat baiting, described his experience and the atmosphere at one of the last old rat pits in London during those times.

Rules 
The officials included a referee and timekeeper. Pits were sometimes covered above with wire mesh or had additional security devices installed on the walls to prevent the rats from escaping. Rules varied from match to match.

In one variation, a weight handicap was set for each dog. The competing dog had to kill as many rats as the number of pounds the dog weighed, within a specific, preset time. The prescribed number of rats was released and the dog was put in the ring. The clock started the moment the dog touched the ground. When the dog seized the last rat, his owner grabbed it and the clock stopped.

Rats that were thought still to be alive were laid out on the table in a circle before the referee. The referee then struck the animals three times on the tail with a stick. If a rat managed to crawl out of the circle, it was considered to be alive. Depending on the particular rules for that match, the dog may be disqualified or have to go back in the ring with these rats and kill them. The new time was added to the original time.

A combination of the quickest time, the number of rats, and the dog's weight decided the victory. A rate of five seconds per rat killed was considered quite satisfactory; 15 rats in a minute was an excellent result.

Cornered rats will attack and can deliver a very painful bite. Not uncommonly, a ratter (rat-killing dog) was left with only one eye in its retirement.

Rat-catcher 
Before the contest could begin, the capture of potentially thousands of rats was required. The rat catcher would be called upon to fulfill this requirement. Jack Black, a rat catcher from Victorian England supplied live rats for baiting.

Technique 
Faster dogs were preferred. They would bite once. The process was described as "rather like a sheepdog keeping a flock bunched to be brought out singly for dipping," where the dog would herd the rats together, and kill any rats that left the pack with a quick bite.

Breeds 

The ratting dogs were typically working terrier breeds, which included the bull and terrier, Bull Terrier, Bedlington Terrier, Fox Terrier, Jack Russell Terrier, Rat Terrier, Black and Tan Terrier, Manchester Terrier, Yorkshire Terrier,   and Staffordshire Bull Terrier. The degree of care used in breeding these ratters is clear in their pedigrees, with good breeding leading to increased business opportunities. Successful breeders were highly regarded in those times. In modern times, the Plummer Terrier is considered a premiere breed for rat-catching.

Billy 
A celebrated bull and terrier named "Billy" weighing about 12 kg (26 lb), had a proud fighting history and his pedigree reflects the build-up over a period of years. The dog was owned by Charles Dew and was bred by breeder James Yardington. On the paternal side is "Old Billy" from the kennel of John Tattersal from Wotton-under-Edge, Gloucestershire, and was descended from the best line of all Old English Bulldogs. On the maternal side is "Yardington's Sal" descended from the Curley line. The pedigree of all these dogs can be traced back more than 40  years and numerous old accounts exist about them.

The October 1822, edition of The Sporting Magazine provided descriptions of two rat pit matches with Billy, quoted as:

Billy's best competition results are:

Billy's career was crowned on 22 April 1823, when a world record was set with 100  rats killed in five and a half minutes. This record stood until 1862, when it was claimed by another ratter named "Jacko". Billy continued in the rat pit until old age, reportedly with only one eye and two teeth remaining.

Jacko 

According to the Sporting Chronicle Annual, the world record in rat killing is held by a black and tan bull and terrier named "Jacko", weighing about 13 lb and owned by Jemmy Shaw. Jacko had these contest results:

Jacko set two world records, the first on 29 July 1862, with a killing time of 2.7 seconds per rat and the second on 1 May 1862, with his fight against 100 rats, where Jacko worked two seconds faster than the previous world record holder "Billy". The feat of killing 1,000 rats took place over a 10-week period, with 100 rats being killed each week ending on 1 May 1862.

Tiny the Wonder 

Tiny the Wonder was a famous mid-19th century English Toy Terrier (Black & Tan) that could kill 200 rats in an hour, which he achieved twice, on 28 March 1848 and 27 March 1849, with time to spare.  For a period of time Tiny maintained the record for killing 300 rats in under 55 minutes.  Tiny only weighed five and a  half pounds with a neck so small, a woman's bracelet could be used as a dog collar.   From 1848 to 1849, Tiny was owned by Jemmy Shaw, the landlord of the Blue Anchor Tavern at 102 Bunhill Row, St. Luke's, London Borough of Islington; the pub is now named the Artillery Arms.  Tiny was a star attraction at the Blue Anchor Tavern, with crowds gathering to watch the action in the rat pit.  Shaw preferred to acquire the rats from Essex as opposed to sewer rats to decrease potential health risks to Tiny.  Shaw was able to keep up to 2,000 rats at his establishment.  This is a commentary about Tiny from a poster published from those times:

"The 5 1/2 pounds of black and tan fury! This extraordinary Black and Tan has won 50 interesting events, including the following matches: 2 matches of 6 rats when he weighed 4 1/2 pounds, 20 matches of 12 rats at 5 pounds of weight, 15 matches of 20 rats at 5-pound weight, 1 match of 50 rats ands 1 match of 100 rats in 34 minutes 40 seconds on Tuesday, March 30, 1847. Tiny beat Summertown bitch "Crack" of 8 pounds, 12 Rats each, September 14th. Beat the dog "Twig" at 6 1/2 pounds on November 7th. On Tuesday, March 28, 1848, he was matched to kill 300 rats in 3 hours. He accomplished the unprecedented test in 54 minutes 50 seconds, which took place in the presence of a crowded audience at the Blue Anchor, Bonhill Row, St. Lukes. May 2, killed 20 rats in 8 minutes; May 23 won a match of 50 rats against Mr. Batty's bitch "Fun," 8 pounds. August 15, won a match against "Jim," 50 rats; September 5 won a match of 12 rats, 2 minutes 30 seconds. November 4 won a match of 100 rats, 30 minutes 5 seconds; January 31, 1849, won a match of 100 rats, 20 minutes 5 seconds; March 27 killed 200 rats 59 minutes 58 seconds."

Jack 

Jack was a Black and Tan Terrier owned by Kit Burns in New York City in the mid- to late 19th century. Jack was a prized ratter, and Burns claimed that Jack killed 100 rats in 5 minutes and 40 seconds.  Burns had Jack taxidermied and mounted him, alongside other prized dogs, on the bar of his tavern called the Sportsmen's Hall, located at 273 Water Street.  Burns' first-floor amphitheatre could hold 100 spectators who were charged an admission of $1.50 to $5.00 depending on the dogs' quality, nearly a skilled labourer's daily wages. The rat pit was about 8 ft square with 4-ft-high walls.  On the New York City waterfront rat baiting was quite lucrative with a purse of $125 not uncommon. This created a high demand for rats with some rat catchers earning $0.05 to $0.12 per rat.

Kit Burns' rat-pit activities are described by author James Dabney McCabe in his book Secrets of the Great City,  published in 1868, at page 388, as follows:

"Rats are plentiful along the East River and Burns has no difficulty in procuring as many as he desires.  These and his dogs furnish the entertainment in which he delights.  The principal room of the house is arranged as an amphitheatre.  The seats are rough wooden benches and in the centre is a ring or pit enclosed by a circular wooden fence several feet high.  A number of rats are turned into this pit and a dog of the best ferret stock is thrown in amongst them.  The little creature at once falls to work to kill the rats, bets being made that she will destroy, so many rats in a given time.  The time is generally made by the little animal who is well known to and a great favorite with the yelling blasphemous wretches who line the benches.  The performance is greeted with shouts oaths and other frantic demonstrations of delight.  Some of the men will catch up the dog in their arms and press it to their bosom in a frenzy of joy or kiss it as if it were a human being unmindful or careless of the fact that all this while the animal is smeared with the blood of its victims. The scene is disgusting beyond description."

On November 31, 1870, Henry Bergh the founder of the American Society for the Prevention of Cruelty to Animals raided the Sportsman's Hall and arrested Burns under an anti-cruelty to animals law passed by the New York state legislature four years prior. The Sportsman Hall stayed permanently closed after the raid.

Although little of the original structure remains, Sportsman's Hall occupied the land where the Joseph Rose House and Shop, a four-unit luxury apartment house, now lies and is the third oldest house in Manhattan after St. Paul's Chapel and the Morris-Jumel Mansion.

Decline 

Toward the latter half of Queen Victoria's reign, criticism on the practice mounted. The animal welfare movement opposed the practice much like they did other forms of animal baiting. More favourable ideas of rats as living animals rather than vermin arose, alongside a new interest in their positive role in the maintenance of an urban ecosystem. (It was only after the decline of rat baiting that rats became associated with the spread of disease.) Additionally, when ratting moved from being a countryside pastime to the betting arenas of inner London, it became associated with the base vices of lower-class citizens. Baiting sports diminished in popularity and the dog exhibition shows brought by the gentry slowly replaced the attraction as a more enlightened form of animal entertainment.

The last public competition in the United Kingdom took place in Leicester in 1912. The owner was prosecuted and fined, and had to give a promise to the court that he would never again promote such entertainment.

Ratting in modern times 

Ratting and rat-baiting are not the same activities. Ratting is the legal use of dogs for pest control of non-captured rats in an unconfined space, such as a barn or field. Due to rat infestations, terriers are now being used for ratting to hunt and kill rats in major cities around the world, including the United Kingdom, the United States and Vietnam. Although ratting with working terriers is far less efficient than using rodenticide or rat traps, the potential for the killing of nontarget species is zero.

In popular culture 
A rat-baiting scene is included in the 1979 film The First Great Train Robbery.
In the movie Gangs of New York (2002), a scene involves rat baiting.

In the book Let Loose the Dogs (2003) by Maureen Jennings, as well as its TV adaptation, the main storyline is that a murder occurred following a rat-baiting contest.

In Season 1, Episode 4 of The Knick (2014), there is a scene depicting rat baiting. A human, rather than a dog, is the one in the pit with the rats.

Gallery

See also

 Earthdog trial
 Huddersfield Ben, ratting dog.
 Hatch, earliest scientifically confirmed ratting dog.

References

Bibliography

 Barnett, A. (2002). The Story of Rats: Their Impact on Us, and Our Impact on Them. Allen & Unwin, Crows Nest, NSW. 
 Fleig, D. (1996). History of Fighting Dogs. pp. 105–112 T.F.H. Publications. 
 Hendrickson, R. (1984). More Cunning Than Man: A Social History of Rats and Man. Stein & Day Pub. 
 Homan, M. (2000). A Complete History of Fighting Dogs. pp. 121–131 Howell Book House Inc. 
 Matthews, I. (1898). Full Revelations of a Professional Rat-Catcher. Kessinger Publishing. 
 Mayhew, H. (1851). London Labour and the London Poor, Volume 3, Chp 1, Jimmy Shaw. London: Griffen, Bohn and Company, Stationer's Hall Court.  London: Griffen, Bohn and Company, Stationer's Hall Court.
 Plummer, D. (1979). Tales of a Rat-hunting Man. 
 Rodwell, J. (1858). The Rat: Its History & Destructive Character. G. Routledge & Co. London. 
 Rodwell, J. (1850). The Rat! and Its Cruel Cost to the Nation. Palala Press. 
 Sullivan, R. (2004). Rats: A Year with New York's Most Unwanted Inhabitants. Granta Books, London. 
 Sullivan, R. (2005). Rats : Observations on the History and Habitat of the City's Most Unwanted Inhabitants. Chapter 9 Bloomsbury USA. 
 Zinsser, H. (1935).  Rats, Lice and History. Blue Ribbon Books, Inc.

External links 

 Terriers at rat pits
 Turnspit Public House, Quakers Alley
 Terrier Man – Rat Dogs
 Scientific American, "Monkey, Dog, and Rats", 20 November 1880, p. 326 (report of a competition to kill twelve rats between a monkey and fox terrier)